Joseph Jacobberger (March 19, 1869March 18, 1930) was an American architect based in Portland, Oregon. He partnered with Alfred H. Smith in the firm Jacobberger and Smith.

Early life
Jacobberger was born on March 19, 1869, in Lautenbach, Haut-Rhin, Alsace, France to cousins Hubert Jacobberger and Josephine Jacobberger.  The Jacobbergers immigrated to the United States in 1872. The family moved to Omaha, Nebraska, where Hubert Jacobberger became a building contractor. Joseph Jacobberger later attended Creighton University, graduating c1887.

He worked briefly in Minneapolis then worked with A.R. Saunders in Tacoma prior to settling in Portland in 1890. In Portland, Jacobberger began as a draftsman in the firm Whidden & Lewis.

Career
Jacobberger left Portland in the 1890s and worked with Frank Chamberlain Clark in the Los Angeles offices of Frank Roehrig. He returned to Portland in 1900 and began to build his own practice.

An early contract was the campus design at the University of Portland, known in 1901 as Columbia University. Jacobberger began an association with the Catholic Archdiocese of Portland that resulted in several design projects, although during his first decade as an independent architect in Portland, Jacobberger preferred residential designs and small commercial projects.

In 1912 Jacobberger formed a partnership with Alfred H. Smith that would continue until 1930. The firm Jacobberger and Smith was responsible for many buildings listed on the National Register of Historic Places.

Death
Jacobberger suffered a heart attack in 1930. While recovering, he had another attack and died one day before his 61st birthday.

Works

A partial list of Jacobberger's and the firm's works include (with individual or joint attribution):
Josef Jacobberger House (1906–07), 1502 SW. Upper Hall St. Portland, Oregon (Jacobberger,Josef), NRHP-listed
Daniel J. Malarkey House (1909), 2141 SW Hillcrest Pl., Portland, (Jacobberger, Joseph), NRHP-listed
Boschke-Boyd House (1910), 2211 NE Thompson St. Portland, (Jacobberger and Smith), NRHP-listed
Markle-Pittock House (1928 renovation), 1816 SW Hawthorne Terr., Portland, (Jacobberger & Smith), NRHP-listed

Auto Rest Garage, 925-935 10th Ave., SW, Portland, (Jacobberger & Smith), NRHP-listed 
Calumet Hotel, 620 SW Park St., Portland, (Jacobberger,Jacob), NRHP-listed 
James C. and Mary A. Costello House, 2043 NE Tillamook, Portland, (Jacobberger, Joseph), NRHP-listed
Frank E. Dooly House, 2670 NW Lovejoy St., Portland, (Jacobberger,Josef), NRHP-listed
Giesy-Failing House, 1965 SW. Montgomery Pl., Portland, (Jacobberger & Smith; Jacobberger,Joseph), NRHP-listed
Hibernian Hall, 128 NE Russell, Portland, (Jacobberger, Joseph & Smith, Alfred), NRHP-listed
Joseph Jacobberger Country House, 5545 SW Sweetbriar Street, near Portland, NRHP-listed
Lombard Automobile Buildings, 123-35 NW Broadway;134 NW 8th Ave., Portland, (Jacobberger, Joseph), NRHP-listed
McDougall-Campbell House, 3846 N.W. Thurman St., Portland, (Jacobberger, Joseph), NRHP-listed
Monastery of the Precious Blood, 1208 SE 76th, Portland, (Jacobberger & Smith), NRHP-listed
Jacques and Amelia Reinhart House, 7821 S.E. Thirtieth Ave., Portland, (Jacobberger & Smith), NRHP-listed
Dr. James Rosenfeld House, 2125 SW Twenty-first Ave., Portland, (Jacobberger,Joseph), NRHP-listed
St. Mary Roman Catholic Church (Eugene, Oregon), 1062 Charnelton St., Eugene, Oregon (Jacobberger, Joseph).
Alfred H. and Mary E. Smith House, 1806 SW High St., Portland, (Jacobberger, Joseph), NRHP-listed
Walter V. Smith House, 1943 SW. Montgomery Dr., Portland, (Jacobberger,Joseph), NRHP-listed
Villa St. Rose, 597 N. Dekum St., Portland, (Jacobberger, Joseph), NRHP-listed
Frank M. Warren House, 2545 NW. Westover Rd., Portland, (Jacobberger,Joseph), NRHP-listed
 Aquinas Hall, B.P. John Administrative Building, and Flavia Hall, Marylhurst University
 Emma Austin House, 49 Briarwood Rd., Lake Oswego, (Jacobberger, Joseph, attributed), Classic Houses of Portland, Oregon, William Hawkins III. Timber Press Inc., 2005. Page

References

20th-century American architects
Architects from Portland, Oregon
1869 births
1930 deaths
People from Alsace-Lorraine
Creighton University alumni
19th-century American architects